Curzon Film, formerly known as Artificial Eye or Curzon Artificial Eye, is a British film distributor, specialising in independent, foreign-language and art house films for cinema and home entertainment.

History
Artificial Eye was founded in 1976 by Andi Engel (11 November 1942 – 26 December 2006), a German-born film enthusiast, and his then wife, Pamela Balfry, who had a background working with Richard Roud at the London Film Festival. She became the company's first managing director.

In 2006 Artificial Eye became a part of Curzon World, a group of companies in the film entertainment industry which also includes the Curzon chain of 13 cinemas plus eight joint venture cinemas, video on demand service Curzon Home Cinema, the retail DVD distributor Fusion Media Sales, and horror film distributor Chelsea Films (launched in 2010).

Curzon Artificial Eye releases some 20 new theatrical films and 30 DVD and Blu-ray titles in the UK each year, as well as digital releases via several platforms, such as iTunes and in-house Curzon Home Cinema.

In 2016, Curzon Artificial Eye renamed to Curzon Film.

On 23 December 2019, Curzon Artificial Eye, along with parent company Curzon, was acquired by American film distributor Cohen Media Group.

In 2020, Curzon Film released Parasite to UK audiences, which would become UK's highest grossing foreign language film of all time.

References

External links
  – official site

Curzon Artificial Eye films
Film distributors of the United Kingdom